Bénédicte Couvreur is a French film producer. She studied at the French cinema school, La Fémis.

Filmography
 Plus que deux (2002) (associate producer)
 Loup! (2002) (producer) 
 Ni vue, ni connue (2003) (producer) 
 Speculoos (2003) (producer) 
 On est mort un million de fois (2005) (producer) 
 Beyond Hatred (2005) (executive producer) aka Au delà de la haine (French title) 
 Celebration (2006) (executive producer) 
 La dérive des continents (2006) (TV) (producer) 
 L'homme qui rêvait d'un enfant (2006) (producer) 
 Water Lilies (2007) (producer) aka Naissance des pieuvres (French title) 
 La part animale (2007) (producer) 
 L'âge de l'amour (2007) (TV) (producer)
 P.O.V. (executive producer) (1 TV episode in 2009 : Beyond Hatred)
 Tomboy (2011) (producer)
 Parade (2013) (producer)
 Girlhood (2014) (producer)
 Portrait of a Lady on Fire (2019) (producer)
 Petite Maman (2021) (producer)

References

External links
 

French film producers
Living people
Year of birth missing (living people)